Clifford University is a private Christian co-educational Nigerian university owned and operated by the Seventh-day Adventist Church in Nigeria. The university is located in Ihie, Abia State, Nigeria.

It is a part of the Seventh-day Adventist education system, the world's second largest Christian school system.

History 
Clifford University is established on land that belonged to an Adventist school until it was seized by the government following the country's 1967–70 civil war. The government returned the land to the church in 2013. It is named after Jesse Clifford - a British missionary who brought Adventism to eastern Nigeria in 1923, serving in Nigeria for eight years.

See also

 List of Seventh-day Adventist colleges and universities
 Seventh-day Adventist education
 Seventh-day Adventist Church
 Seventh-day Adventist theology
 History of the Seventh-day Adventist Church

References

External links
 Official website

Universities and colleges in Nigeria
Universities and colleges affiliated with the Seventh-day Adventist Church
Christian universities and colleges in Nigeria
Educational institutions established in 2013
2013 establishments in Nigeria